Zavidovići is a town and municipality located in Zenica-Doboj Canton of the Federation of Bosnia and Herzegovina, an entity of Bosnia and Herzegovina. It is situated in central Bosnia and Herzegovina, located between Doboj and Zenica on the confluence of rivers Bosna, Krivaja and Gostović. It sits in a valley surrounded by many mountains of which the largest is Klek. As of 2013, the municipality had a population of 35,988 inhabitants and the town itself 8,174.

History
Zavidovići was home to two neolithic cultures: Butmir and Kakanj. Significant Kakanj culture site is located in Tuk.

Zavidovići was developed by the Austrians during the 19th century Austro-Hungarian reign in Bosnia, mostly because of the "wood industry".  After World War II, Krivaja, the company that was founded in 1884 and named after the Krivaja river, expanded.  The company focused on furniture manufacturing, which it began to export to the United States under the name "Krivaja Beechbrook".  Due to the Bosnian war in the 1990s, the former giant and the town are left with almost nothing.

Although once a diverse town, many of the former Serb and Croat residents left their homes during the Bosnian war. Few have returned to their properties. Now, it is a mostly Bosniak town, with few non-Bosniaks remaining.

Zavidovići's nickname is "Wood Town". Zavidovići is located in the basin of three rivers: Bosna, Krivaja and Gostović.

Geography

Mountains
 

Klek

Demographics
The town of Zavidovići itself had 12,947 residents in 1991.

Settlements

Notable people

Edin Bašić, handball player
Aida Čorbadžić, opera singer
Alija Bešić, Bosnian-born Luxembourgian footballer
Mladen Bartolović, footballer
Ferid Muhić, President of the Bosniak Academy of Sciences and Arts
Nedžad Sinanović, basketball player
Safet Sušić, footballer and football manager
Sead Sušić, footballer
Šefik Džaferović, politician, the vice president of SDA and the Bosniak Member of the Presidency of Bosnia and Herzegovina
Venio Losert, handball player and two-time Olympic gold-medallist
Monika Radulovic, Australian model and beauty pageant titleholder who was crowned Miss Universe Australia 2015

Twin towns – sister cities

Zavidovići is twinned with:

 Berane, Montenegro
 Bozüyük, Turkey
 Gemlik, Turkey
 Kakanj, Bosnia and Herzegovina
 Nilüfer, Turkey
 Roncadelle, Italy
 Wiltz, Luxembourg
 Yunusemre, Turkey

References

External links

ZaN 
Portal Krivajske Doline 
Large iron ball just discovered near Zavidovici

 
Populated places in Zavidovići